The 2015 Philadelphia mayoral election was held on November 3, 2015, to elect the Mayor of Philadelphia, Pennsylvania, concurrently with various other state and local elections. Heavily favored Democratic party candidate Jim Kenney won.

Incumbent Democratic party Mayor Michael Nutter could not run for re-election to a third consecutive term due to term limits in the city's home rule charter. Registered Democrats hold a formidable 7-to-1 ratio over registered Republicans in Philadelphia, giving Democratic candidates a distinct advantage in citywide elections.

The mayoral primary elections were held on May 19, 2015. 27% of the city's registered voters voted in the primaries. Democrats nominated Jim Kenney, a member of the Philadelphia City Council, as their party's nominee. Kenney won the primary in a landslide with 55.83% of the vote, defeating a crowded field of five other Democratic candidates, including Anthony H. Williams and former District Attorney Lynn Abraham. Republican Melissa Murray Bailey, a business executive, ran unopposed for the Republican nomination. Had she been elected, Bailey would have become Philadelphia's first female mayor, as well as the city's first Republican mayor in more than 60 years.

Democratic primary

Candidates

Declared 
 Lynne Abraham, former District Attorney of Philadelphia
 Nelson Diaz, former City Solicitor and former Common Pleas judge
 James F. Kenney, former Philadelphia City Councilman
 Doug Oliver, Vice President of Marketing and Corporate Communications at Philadelphia Gas Works and former press secretary for Mayor Nutter
 Milton Street, former State Senator and candidate for Mayor in 2011
 Anthony H. Williams, Minority Whip of the Pennsylvania State Senate and candidate for governor in 2010

Withdrew 
 Jon Bell
 Terry Gillen, former Philadelphia Director of Federal Affairs and former Executive Director of the Philadelphia Redevelopment Authority
 Keith Goodman, pastor and candidate for Chester City Council in 2005
 Ken Trujillo, former City Solicitor

Declined 
 Alan Butkovitz, Philadelphia City Controller
 Darrell L. Clarke, Philadelphia City Council President
 Dwight E. Evans, State Representative, candidate for lieutenant governor in 1986, candidate for Governor in 1994 and candidate for Mayor in 1999 and 2007
 Bill Green, former Philadelphia City Councilman and chair of the Philadelphia School Reform Commission
 Renée Cardwell Hughes, Chief Executive Officer of the Southeastern Pennsylvania Red Cross and former Common Pleas judge
 Kevin R. Johnson, Philadelphia clergyman and pastor of Bright Hope Baptist Church
 Sam Katz, businessman, public finance executive and Republican nominee for Mayor in 1999 and 2003
 Tom Knox, businessman, candidate for Mayor in 2007 and candidate for Governor in 2010
 Alba Martinez, former city Human Services Commissioner and former CEO of the United Way of Southeastern Pennsylvania
 Richard Negrin, Philadelphia Managing Director
 Frank L. Rizzo, Jr., former Republican Philadelphia City Councilman (running for the City Council)
 Jonathan Saidel, former Philadelphia City Controller
 R. Seth Williams, District Attorney of Philadelphia

Polling 

 * Internal poll for the Alan Butkovitz campaign

 * AFSCME poll for the James Kenney campaign.

 * Public Policy Polling poll for the James Kenney campaign.

Results

Republican primary

Candidates

Declared 
 Melissa Murray Bailey, businesswoman

Declined 
 Ronald D. Castille, former Chief Justice of the Supreme Court of Pennsylvania, former District Attorney of Philadelphia and candidate for Mayor in 1991
 Sean Clark, nonprofit executive
 Allan Domb, real estate developer and President of the Greater Philadelphia Association of Realtors
 Rhashea Harmon, attorney and nominee for the State Senate in 2010 (running as an Independent)
 Kelvin Jeremiah, President & CEO of the Philadelphia Housing Authority
 Sam Katz, businessman, public finance executive and Republican nominee for Mayor in 1999 and 2003
 Elmer Money, candidate for City Council in 2011
 Doug Oliver, Vice President of Marketing and Corporate Communications at Philadelphia Gas Works and former press secretary for Mayor Nutter (running as a Democrat)
 Dana Spain, businesswoman and philanthropist

Results

Independent

Candidates

Declared 
 Rhashea Harmon, attorney and Republican nominee for the State Senate in 2010

Declined 
 Bill Green, former Philadelphia City Councilman and former chair of the Philadelphia School Reform Commission
 Sam Katz, businessman, public finance executive and Republican nominee for Mayor in 1999 and 2003
 Dana Spain, businesswoman and philanthropist

General election

Candidates 
 Melissa Murray Bailey – Republican Party
 James Foster – Independent
 Osborne Hart – Socialist Workers Party 
 Jim Kenney – Democratic Party 
 Boris Kindij – Independent

Results

References 

2015 in Philadelphia
Philadelphia
Philadelphia
2015